6 Ellerdale Road (now the Institute of St Marcellina) is a house built by the Arts and Crafts movement architect Richard Norman Shaw for himself in the period 1874 to 1876.

It is a large red brick detached house between Frognal and Hampstead in London.

It was designated a Grade I listed building in 1950.  Since 2006 it has been used as residential accommodation for foreign female students attending English courses in London. Run by the Sisters of Saint Marcellina, it is now known as Hampstead Towers.

References

Camden listed buildings information

Houses in Hampstead
Convents in England
Grade I listed convents
Grade I listed houses in London
Richard Norman Shaw buildings
Frognal